The seventh season of the long-running Australian medical drama All Saints began airing on 17 February 2004 and concluded on 16 November 2004 with a total of 40 episodes.

Plot 
The aftermath of the shooting hangs like a dark cloud over everyone’s head.

As Terri fights to save Ward 17 from permanent closure, the staff around her work through battles of their own.

Nelson finds himself in emotionally difficult territory after hitting a child on her bike with his car, and as Sterlo’s drug usage worsens, he resorts to desperate measures when police come knocking.

Terri is forced to face her mortality upon being diagnosed with a rare heart tumour. The fight for Ward 17 is lost and staff that remain have a baptism by fire moving to the Emergency Department which is run by the hard-nosed Frank Campion.

Families in crisis at the hospital give both Frank and Charlotte cause to think about their own situations. Frank is struggling to deal with his autistic daughter Kathleen, and Charlotte has realised that becoming a mother is her priority however searching for a sperm donor threatens to destroy her relationship.

In romantic developments, Luke is moving to the US and Paula must decide whether to follow him. Terri finds herself looking at Jack in a new light, and Cate wonders if new Ambo Mac will ever admit his true feelings for her.

Cast

Main cast 
 Georgie Parker as Terri Sullivan
 Judith McGrath as Von Ryan
 Christopher Gabardi as Vincent Hughes
 Tammy MacIntosh as Charlotte Beaumont 
 Paul Tassone as Nelson Curtis
 Celia Ireland as Regina Butcher (37 episodes)
 Wil Traval as Jack Quade (34 episodes, from episode 2)
 Conrad Coleby as Scott Zinenko (episodes 1–32)
 John Howard as Frank Campion (episodes 11–40)
 Natalie Saleeba as Jessica Singleton (episodes 11–40)
 Alexandra Davies as Cate McMasters (24 episodes, from episode 16)
 Henry Nixon as Sterling McCormack (episodes 1–18)
 Mark Priestley as Dan Goldman (16 episodes, from episode 24)
 Fletcher Humphrys as Alex Kearns (episodes 1–15)
 Jenni Baird as Paula Morgan (episodes 1–12)
 Martin Lynes as Luke Forlano (episodes 1–12)

Recurring cast 
 Grant Bowler as Nigel ‘Mac’ MacPherson (12 episodes)
 Adrienne Pickering as Sophia Beaumont (9 episodes)
 Katrina Campbell as Addy (9 episodes)
 Kimberley Joseph as Grace Connelly (7 episodes)
 Jason Lee as Sean Lim (7 episodes)
 Liz Alexander as Dr Alison Newell (7 episodes)
 Anne Looby as Julia Archer (5 episodes)
 Troy Planet as Denis Pool (4 episodes)
 Roy Billing as Murray Blackwood (4 episodes)
 Trilby Beresford as Kathleen Campion (4 episodes)
 Jack Rickard as Max Morgan (3 episodes)
 Rhett Giles as Michael Plummer (3 episodes)
 Jaime Mears as Kerry Lytton (3 episodes)
 Helen Dallimore as Loretta Giorgio (2 episodes)
 Lois Ramsey as Norma Blunt (3 episodes)
 Kim Hilas as Joan Marden (2 episodes)

Guest cast 
 Max Cullen as Moses (3 episodes)
 Robert Coleby as Professor Richard Craig (2 episodes)
 Emma Jackson as Megan (2 episodes)
 Elspeth Ballantyne as Anne Lytton (2 episodes)
 Josh Quong Tart as Matt Horner (1 episode)
 Rachael Coopes as Kirsten Horner (1 episode)
 Katie Spinks as Priscilla Horner (1 episode)
 Victoria Langley as Margaret O'Brien (1 episode)
 Jason Chong as Dr Oscar Wu (1 episode)
 Ray Barrett as Doc Connelly (1 episode)
 Russell Dykstra as Grant Jenkins (1 episode)
 Peter Kowitz as Ronnie Tucker (1 episode)
 Peter Rowsthorn as John Morton (1 episode)
 Edith Podesta as Lana Dawson (1 episode)
 David Koch as Elvis (1 episode)
 Melissa Tkautz as Andrea Stuart (1 episode)

Notes

Episodes

References

General
 Zuk, T. All Saints Series 7 episode guide, Australian Television Information Archive. Retrieved 15 July 2008.
 TV.com editors. All Saints Episode Guide - Season 7, TV.com. Retrieved 15 July 2008.

Specific

All Saints (TV series) seasons
2004 Australian television seasons